A New Trilogy is the second extended play by South Korean girl group Lovelyz. It was released on April 25, 2016 by Woollim Label and distributed by LOEN Entertainment. The EP consists of seven tracks, including the lead single "Destiny". The EP is the first part of their second trilogy 'Love'.

Background and release
On April 4, 2016 Woollim Entertainment released the teaser for A New Trilogy. On April 19, the prologue video was released. On April 21, the track listing was revealed to include seven tracks, including the lead single "Destiny".
On April 22, the teaser music video was released. On April 23, the mini-album preview video was released. A New Trilogy was officially released alongside the music video for "Destiny" on April 25.

Reception
The lead single "Destiny" was praised by American producer Brent Fischer for its "world-class grooves and current arrangements". He also expressed his interest in helping the group's entry into the American music industry.

Track listing

Charts

Weekly chart

Year-end chart

Release history

References

Lovelyz albums
2016 EPs
Korean-language EPs
Woollim Entertainment EPs
Kakao M EPs